Alanis Obomsawin,  (born August 31, 1932) is an Abenaki American-Canadian filmmaker, singer, artist, and activist primarily known for her documentary films. Born in New Hampshire, United States and raised primarily in Quebec, Canada, she has written and directed many National Film Board of Canada documentaries on First Nations issues. Obomsawin is a member of Film Fatales independent women filmmakers.

Obomsawin relates that "the basic purpose [of her films] is for our people to have a voice [...] no matter what we're talking about whether it has to do with having our existence recognized, or whether it has to do with speaking about our values, our survival, our beliefs, that we belong to something beautiful, that it's O.K. to be an Indian, to be a native person in this country". Her best known documentary is Kanehsatake: 270 Years of Resistance, regarding the 1990 Oka Crisis in Quebec.

Early life
Obomsawin, which means "pathfinder", was born on August 31, 1932, near Lebanon, New Hampshire. When she was six months old, her family returned to the Odanak reserve located near Sorel, Quebec, northeast of Montreal, Canada, where she lived until she was seven years old. Her mother ran a boarding house and her father was a medicine maker and a guide. During this period they lived with her maternal aunt Jesse Benedict, her husband Levi Benedict, and their own six children. Théophile Panadis, her mother's cousin, initiated Obomsawin into the history of the Abenaki Nation and taught her many songs and legends.

When she was nine years old, Obomsawin and her parents left Odanak for Trois-Rivières, where they were the only Native family. Cut off, at that time speaking little French and no English, Obomsawin held fast to the songs and stories she had learned on the reserve. Her father died of tuberculosis when she was twelve.

At 22 she left the reserve. During a two-year stay in Florida she also learned English. In the late 1950s she moved back to Montreal and began performing as a singer and a storyteller, making appearances on reservations, in prisons and schools, and at music festivals. In 1960, she debuted as a singer during a concert at Town Hall in Manhattan.

Her only child, Kisos Obomsawin, was born in 1969.

Career

Singer, songwriter
In 1960, Obomsawin made her professional debut as a singer-songwriter in New York City. As a performer Obomsawin has toured Canada, the United States and Europe performing for humanitarian causes in universities, museums, prisons, and art-centers, as well as at folk art festivals. She was featured on the Canadian Broadcasting (CBC) television program, Telescope, regarding her campaign to found a swimming pool for native reserve.

She managed her own stage at the Mariposa Folk Festival in the 1960s. Her 1988 album Bush Lady featured traditional songs of the Abenaki people, as well as original compositions. Originally released on her own private press, it was remastered and re-released in 2018 by Constellation Records.

Filmmaker, producer, educator
Obomsawin first film came to the attention of the National Film Board (NFB) in the mid-1960s, when she held fundraising concerts to pay for the construction of a swimming pool in Odanak. Children in her community were no longer able to swim in the Saint Francis River, but were not allowed to use a pool in a neighboring community, which was for white residents only. Obomsawin's success in raising funds for a construction of a pool for Odanak children was through an interview about her film in a report by the CBC-TV's Telescope series, which was seen by NFB producers Joe Koenig and Bob Verrall.

"It was from there the National Film-Board (NFB) saw it and I was invited by some producers to talk to some of the filmmakers there," said Obomsawin. "I discovered that they had a studio that only catered to [the] classroom, with educational film strips."

They invited the singer-storyteller to their film board to work as an advisor on a film about Aboriginal people. She went on to direct films of her own, while continuing to perform and fight for justice for her people.

Obomsawin directed her first documentary for the NFB, Christmas at Moose Factory, in 1971. As of August 2017, she has directed 50 films with the NFB, with her documentary film Our People Will Be Healed, about the Helen Betty Osborne Ininiw Education Resource Centre in Norway House Cree Nation, premiering in the Masters-program of the 2017 Toronto International Film Festival.

Obomsawin's next films include: Incident at Restigouche (1984), a powerful depiction of the Quebec police raid of a Micmac reserve; Richard Cardinal: Cry from a Diary of a Métis Child (1986), the disturbing examination of an adolescent suicide; No Address (1988), a look at Montreal's homeless; as well as Mother of Many Children (1977).

She filmed an entire series of films about a 1990 Oka crisis. The first, Kanehsatake: 270 Years of Resistance (1993), was a feature-length film documenting the 1990  Kanienʼkehá꞉ka uprising in Kanehsatake and Oka, which has won 18 international awards. It was followed by My Name is Kahentiiosta (1995), a film about a young Kahnawake  woman who was arrested after the 78-day armed standoff, and Spudwrench – Kahnawake Man (1997), profiling Randy Horne, a high-steel worker from the Mohawk community of Kahnawake. The 2000 NFB release Rocks at Whiskey Trench was Obomsawin's fourth film in her series about the 1990 Oka crisis. 
 
Her credits include Gene Boy Came Home, about Aboriginal Vietnam War veteran Eugene Benedict.

The Mi'gmaq of Esgenoopetitj (Burnt Church), New Brunswick were the subject of her 2002 documentary, Is the Crown at war with us?, exploring a conflict with the Department of Fisheries and non-native fishers over fishing rights.

Her 2003 NFB documentary Our Nationhood, chronicles the determination and tenacity of the Listuguj Mi'gmaq First Nation to use and manage the natural resources of their traditional lands. In 2005, Ms Obomsawin completed her short drama Sigwan, following a young girl who is aided by the animals of the forest. In 2006, she completed WABAN-AKI: People from Where the Sun Rises a look at the people and stories from her home reserve of Odanak.

In 2009, she completed the documentary Professor Norman Cornett: "Since when do we divorce the right answer from an honest answer? looking at the dismissal of unorthodox McGill University religious studies lecturer Norman Cornett, which was destined for its world premiere at the Hot Docs film festival.

In 2010, Obomsawin completed a short drama When All the Leaves are Gone, about her experiences attending public school in Quebec.

Her 2012 documentary The People of the Kattawapiskak River on the Attawapiskat housing-crisis was conceived when Obomsawin was present in the community in 2011, working on another film for the NFB.

Obomsawin's 2013 documentary Hi-Ho Mistahey!, about Shannen Koostachin, a First Nations education activist, premiered at the 2013 Toronto International Film Festival.

Obomsawin's 2014 documentary Trick or Treaty? was the first film by an indigenous filmmaker to screen in the Masters-program at the Toronto International Film Festival. Obomsawin began conceptualizing the film in 2010 when she was invited by Stan Louttit, Grand Chief of the Mushkegowuk Council, to film a conference the band was hosting regarding Treaty No. 9.

Her 2016 documentary We Can't Make the Same Mistake Twice, explored a human rights complaint filed against the Canadian government over discrimination against First Nation children, which had its world premiere on September 13 at the 2016 Toronto International Film Festival.

At the 2021 Toronto International Film Festival, a special retrospective program of Obomsawsin's films was presented. Obomsawin was named as that year's recipient of TIFF's Jeff Skoll Award in Impact Media.

Obomsawin also taught at the Summer-Institute of Film and Television in Ottawa.

Engraver, print-maker
For more than 25 years, Obomsawin has worked as an engraver and print maker, with exhibitions in Canada and Europe. Mother and child imagery is prominent in her work, which also combines material from her own dreams with animal spirits and historical events. Her work was exhibited at the Maison Lacombe in Quebec in 2007.

Recognition

Awards and personal honors

In 2006 Obomsawin won the award for the Best Documentary - Long Format, the Alanis Obomsawin Award), imagineNATIVE Film and Media Arts Festival for Waban-aki: People from Where the Sun Rises.

A retrospective her work was held from May 14 to 26 of 2008 at the Museum of Modern Art in New York City. That same month, she was honored with the Governor General's Performing Arts Award for Lifetime Artistic Achievement, Canada's highest honour in the performing arts, at Rideau Hall in Ottawa.

In the spring of 2009, Obomsawin was honoured with a special retrospective at Hot Docs and received the festival's Hot Docs Outstanding Achievement Award.

In 2010, she was named to the Playback Canadian Film & Television Hall of Fame.

Obomsawin was named an Honorary Fellow of the Royal Society of Canada for 2013. In January of that year, the Academy of Canadian Cinema & Television announced that Obomsawin would receive its Humanitarian Award for Exceptional Contributions to Community & Public Service, presented at the 2nd Canadian Screen Awards. At the 2013 Toronto International Film Festival, she was a recipient of a Birks Diamond Tribute to the Year's Women in Film.

In October 2015, she received a lifetime achievement award from Chile's Valdivia International Film Festival. In February 2015, the Montreal-based arts peace advocacy group Artistes pour la paix presented her with its lifetime achievement award. In March of that year, she was among the first 35 people named to the inaugural Ordre des arts et des lettres du Québec.

In November 2016, she received the Clyde Gilmour Award from the Toronto Film Critics Association, which called Obomsawin "a significant architect of Canadian cinema and culture." Also in 2016, she received two of Quebec's highest honors when she received the prix Albert-Tessier for contributions to the cinema of Quebec in November, and was named a Grand Officer of the National Order of Quebec, in June of that year.

In March 2017, she received the inaugural Prix Origine at Montreal's Bâtisseuses de la Cité Awards, for her work on Indigenous issues.

In June 2019 she was named a Companion of the Order of Canada.

At the 2019 Vancouver International Film Festival, Obomsawin received the $15,000 Best Canadian Documentary Award, for Jordan River Anderson, the Messenger.

In October 2020 she was named the thirteenth laureate of the Glenn Gould Prize. Her citation read, "Through her multifarious artistic work and public activism, Obomsawin has been one of Canada’s most passionate and visible advocates for Indigenous peoples. She is a highly distinguished documentary filmmaker, and her prolific, internationally acclaimed output for the National Film Board, spanning almost fifty years, has addressed a huge range of themes and issues relating to Canada’s Indigenous peoples. She has also had long careers as a singer-songwriter and visual artist devoted to telling Indigenous stories".

Also in 2020 she received the Iris Tribute, an honor for lifetime work, at the 22nd Quebec Cinema Awards from Québec Cinéma's Comité de représentation professionnelle.

In March 2001, Obomsawin received a Governor General's Award in Visual and Media Arts. An Officer of the Order of Canada, Obomsawin's many honors also include the Luminaria Tribute for Lifetime Achievement from the Santa Fe Film Festival, International Documentary Association's Pioneer Award, the Toronto Women in Film and Television's (TWIFT) Outstanding Achievement Award in Direction, the Canadian Native Arts Foundation National Aboriginal Achievement Award, and the Outstanding Contributions Award from the Canadian Sociology and Anthropology Association (CSAA). The latter marks the first time that the CSAA has honored someone who is not an academic in the field of anthropology or sociology.

Appointments
Obomsawin has chaired the board of directors of the Native Women's Shelter of Montreal and sat on the Canada Council's First People's Advisory Board. She was a board member of Studio 1, the NFB's Aboriginal studio, and a former advisor to the New Initiatives in Film, a Studio D program for women of color and women of the First Nations. As a member of the board of Aboriginal Voices, Obomsawin was part of an initiative to obtain a radio licence for the organization. A lifetime member of the board of directors for the Aboriginal Peoples Television Network, Obomsawin is also a member of the board for Vermont Public Television and National Geographic International.

Degrees
Obomsawin received a fellowship from the Ontario College of Art, an Honorary Doctor of Letters from York University, an Honorary Doctor of Laws from Concordia University, an Honorary Doctor of Literature from Carleton University, an Honorary Doctor of Laws from the University of Western Ontario (October 2007), Honorary Doctor of Letters from the University of British Columbia (May 2010), an Honorary Doctor of Arts from Dartmouth College in 2013, and an Honorary Doctor of Laws from Dalhousie University was awarded to her in April 2016.

In May 2017 Obomsawin received an honorary doctorate from McGill University's School of Continuing Studies. That same month, she was named a Commander in the newly created Order of Montreal, recognizing individuals who have contributed to the development of Montreal.

Ryerson University awarded her an Honorary Doctor of Laws in June 2018.

Awards named for Obomsawin
The impact of Obomsawin's career on documentary and Indigenous film has been highlighted by the creation of two awards in her name. Cinema Politica has awarded the "Alanis Obomsawin Award for Commitment to Community and Resistance" since 2011 and "was inspired by Ms. Obomsawin's awe-inspiring and unstoppable dedication to social justice and political documentary." ImagineNATIVE Film + Media Arts Festival presents "The Alanis Obomsawin Best Documentary Award" every year for achievement in documentary film .

Exhibition
From February to April 2022, the Haus der Kulturen der Welt (English: House of the World's Cultures) dedicated the exhibition The Children Have to Hear Another Story – Alanis Obomsawin to her. The catalog Alanis Obomsawin: Lifework was produced on the occasion of the exhibition.

Filmography

 1971 – Christmas at Moose Factory
 1972 – The Canoe
 1972 – Children
 1972 – History of Manawan, Part One
 1972 – History of Manawan, Part Two
 1972 – Moose Call
 1972 – Partridge
 1972 – Snowshoes
 1975 – Basket (Lhk'wál'us)
 1975 – Farming (Lep'cál)
 1975 – Mount Currie Summer Camp
 1975 – Puberty, Part One
 1975 – Puberty, Part Two
 1975 – Salmon (Tsúqwaoz')
 1975 – Xusum
 1977 – Mother of Many Children
 1977 – Amisk
 1979 – Gabriel Goes to the City
 1979 – Wild Rice Harvest Kenora
 1980 – June in Povungnituk
 1984 – Incident at Restigouche
 1986 – Richard Cardinal: Cry from a Diary of a Métis Child
 1987 – Poundmaker's Lodge: A Healing Place
 1988 – No Address
 1991 – Le patro Le Prévost – 80 Years Later
 1992 – Walker
 1993 – Kanehsatake: 270 Years of Resistance
 1995 – My Name is Kahentiiosta
 1997 – Spudwrench – Kahnawake Man
 2000 – Rocks at Whiskey Trench
 2002 – Is the Crown At War With Us?
 2003 – Our Nationhood
 2005 – Sigwan
 2006 – Waban-Aki: People from Where the Sun Rises
 2007 – Gene Boy Came Home
 2009 – Professor Norman Cornett: "Since when do we divorce the right answer from an honest answer?"
 2010 – When All the Leaves Are Gone
 2012 – The People of the Kattawapiskak River
 2012 – The Federal Court Hearing
 2013 – Hi-Ho Mistahey!
 2014 – Trick or Treaty?
 2016 – We Can't Make the Same Mistake Twice
 2017 – Our People Will Be Healed
 2019 – Jordan River Anderson, the Messenger
 2021 – Honour to Senator Murray Sinclair
 2022 – Bill Reid Remembers

Secondary literature
Alanis Obomsawin: The Vision of a Native Filmmaker, by Randolph Lewis, published in 2006 by the University of Nebraska Press
 Jerry White, "Alanis Obomsawin, Documentary Form and the Canadian Nation(s)" in:  CineAction, number 49, pp. 26–36

References

External links

1932 births
Living people
Abenaki people
Writers from New Hampshire
Companions of the Order of Canada
Grand Officers of the National Order of Quebec
Governor General's Performing Arts Award winners
Film directors from Quebec
Canadian documentary film directors
First Nations filmmakers
Artists from Quebec
Canadian women film directors
Canadian women artists
First Nations musicians
National Film Board of Canada people
Canadian women screenwriters
First Nations women writers
First Nations screenwriters
Indspire Awards
Canadian people of American descent
20th-century First Nations writers
21st-century First Nations writers
20th-century Canadian women writers
21st-century Canadian women writers
Prix Albert-Tessier winners
Canadian women documentary filmmakers